Unitile Group of Companies — Russian group of enterprises specialising in the production and selling of facing tiles, ceramic porcelain tiles, decorative elements and bricks. The holding was established in 2007 at the premises of Stroyfarfor plant, then leading Russian producer of facing tiles.

History 

In the early 2000s Russian economy witnessed a rapid growth in construction volumes. According to Russian Federal State Statistics Service’s data, an average annual growth of 10-14 per cent was registered between 2003 and 2008 in the domestic construction industry. Meanwhile overall Russian market of facing tiles increased 20-25% per annum over these five years. It was due to the fact that it was widely used to replace obsolete technologies, such as water-based painting applications for the walls, etc.

In 2007 Lazar Shaulov merged all of his companies into Unitile holding with regard to better management of assets. It consisted of Stroyfarfor plant (Shakhty), High-melting clay mine in Vladimirskaya (Rostov Oblast), Voronezh ceramic factory (Voronezh), “Quartz” plant (Saint Petersburg), Markin brick factory (village Markin, Rostov Oblast). When it was set up, the group of companies controlled the production of about 25 per cent of facing tiles and ceramic porcelain tiles.

According to the holding's official web site, the total volume of facing tiles and ceramic porcelain tiles produced by the group of companies is approximately 26 million sq. m. per annum. The facing tiles plant in Shakhty (the former “Stroyfarfor” plant) remains the key production asset of the group. The plant in Shakhty produces around 17.6 million sq. m., and the plant in Voronezh - 8.4 million sq. m. of facing tiles and ceramic porcelain tiles per annum. In 2018, the total volume of the Russian market, was estimated at about 200 million sq. m. by IndexBox consulting company; the total domestic production of facing tiles and ceramic porcelain tiles reached 172 million sq. m.

Timeline 
 1954 - foundation of Voronezh ceramic factory. Production capacity: 1.18 million sq. m. per annum. 
 1964 - Shakhty faience plant opens. 
 1978 - a ceramic tiles production site opens at Shakhty faience plant. Production capacity: 1.4 million sq. m. of tiles per annum. 
 1993 - mining operations start at Vladimirskaya high-melting and refractory clay deposit. 
 1998 - large-scale manufacturing improvements. Technical re-equipment of whiteware production site. Start of two facing tile production lines. 
 1999 - national distributor network established, regional subsidiaries open in the cities of Rostov on Don and Novosibirsk. 
 2005 - start of production of a new product - ceramic porcelain tiles. 
 2006 - Shakhty faience plant starts production of dry mix mortars. 
 2007 - holding group Unitile («Юнитайл») established. 
 2009 - introduction of the new brand name Unitile to the market. 
 2012 - mining operations start at Fedorovskoe white-burning clay deposit. 
 2013 - introduction of the new brand name Gracia Ceramica. 
 2016 - Russian Union of Builders awarded Voronezh ceramic factory with a badge of honour “Construction Glory” and an honorary diploma “For the contribution to the development of building and housing sectors”.
 2017 - Unitile's Shakhty production line's modernization program included into the list of “100 Governor’s Investment Projects”

Management 
 Lazar Shaulov (2007–2014)
 Andrey Fradkin (2014–2015)
 Ruslan Nikitin (2016–2018)
 Evgeniy Fedorov (2018-2019)
 Artem Polyakov (2019–present)

Structure of UNITILE group of companies 
The holding company is composed of three production sites in different regions of Russia, two companies specialised in mining and processing of raw materials, a network of sales offices across Russia and CIS countries, warehouse complexes and a logistics center.

 “Shakhty Ceramics” LTD (ООО «Шахтинская керамика»), which manages the facing tile and ceramic porcelain tiles production site in Shakhty, Rostov Oblast. In 2017 the company's revenues were 3 billion 505 million rubles, net profit amounted to RUR78.2 million. The company is fully controlled by the Cyprus-based offshore company Simidella Limited; 
 “Voronezh Ceramics” LTD (ООО «Воронежская керамика») - facing tile and ceramic porcelain tiles production site in the city of Voronezh. In 2017 the company's revenues were RUR1 billion 153 million, net profit amounted to RUR 22.2 million. The company is fully controlled by the Cyprus-based offshore company Simidella Limited; 
 Vladimirskaya high-melting and refractory clay deposit in Krasnosulinsky District of Rostov Oblast. In 2017 the company's revenues were RUR 611.4 million, net profit amounted to RUR 32.1 million. 91.67% of the company belongs to “Shakhty Ceramics” LTD.;
 Markin brick factory in Oktyabrsky District, Rostov Oblast – the largest manufacturer of facing ceramic bricks in the South of Russia; 
 “Unitile” trading house; 
 Managing company of Unitile Holding Company (ООО «УК Юнитайл») – established in late 2018, no financial statements available as of July 2019. Fully controlled by the Cyprus-based offshore company Simidella Limited

References

External links
 

2007 establishments in Russia
Companies based in Rostov Oblast
Retail companies of Russia
Manufacturing companies of Russia